Rhabdotus reflexus is a species of beetle in the family Carabidae, the only species in the genus Rhabdotus.

References

Pterostichinae